John Singer (January 6, 1931 – January 18, 1979) was a farmer in Utah who was killed in a stand-off with state government agents while resisting arrest.

Biography
Singer was born in New York City.  His parents, who were German immigrants, returned to Dresden in 1932 where his father was a Nazi and joined the Schutzstaffel.  Singer's mother was Mormon but her husband forbade her from practicing her religion.  They divorced in 1945 and Singer returned to the United States with his mother.  Singer married Vickie Lemon in 1965 with whom he had seven children and lived on a  farm in Marion, Utah in Summit County.

In 1970 Singer was excommunicated from the LDS Church for not "sustaining the presidency."  In 1978 he entered into a second marriage with Shirley Black, who was still married to another man with four children.

One of the main reasons Singer cited for removing his children from public school was his objection to pictures of black and white children together. The authorities did allow him to have his children home-schooled in a supervised situation. However, in 1978 his second wife's husband won custody of their children.

It is unclear if it was the issue of his not giving up custody of the children or of his home schooling actions that led to the standoff where Singer was killed. In January 1979, after Singer refused to release the children, Utah law enforcement officers returned to arrest him and surrounded his home. After refusing to surrender, he reportedly pointed his pistol at the officers who then shot him multiple times, killing him.

See also 
 Singer-Swapp Standoff

Notes

Further reading

External links
Article on John Singer in the Utah History Encyclopedia
Article on Singer

1931 births
1979 deaths
American Latter Day Saints
Crimes in Utah
American people of German descent
Mormon fundamentalists
People excommunicated by the Church of Jesus Christ of Latter-day Saints
People from Dresden
People from New York City
People from Summit County, Utah
People shot dead by law enforcement officers in the United States